Orthocomotis tambitoa is a species of moth of the family Tortricidae. It is found in the Cordillera Occidental of Colombia.

The wingspan is 23 mm. The ground colour of the forewings is whitish cream, densely spotted brown along the median parts of the interfasciae. The hindwings are greyish brown.

Etymology
The species name refers to the name of the type locality, Tambito.

References

Moths described in 2011
Orthocomotis